Jinshajiangite is a rare silicate mineral named after the Jinshajiang river in China. Its currently accepted formula is BaNaFe4Ti2(Si2O7)2O2(OH)2F. It gives a name of the jinshajiangite group. The mineral is associated with alkaline rocks. In jinshajiangite, there is a potassium-to-barium, calcium-to-sodium, manganese-to-iron and iron-to-titanium diadochy substitution. Jinshajiangite is the iron-analogue of surkhobite and perraultite. It is chemically related to bafertisite, cámaraite and emmerichite. Its structure is related to that of bafertisite. Jinshajiangite is a titanosilicate with heteropolyhedral HOH layers, where the H-layer is a mixed tetrahedral-octahedral layer, and the O-layer is simply octahedral.

The mineral has only two known places of natural occurrences; a dyke near Jinshajiang River, Sichuan Province and the intrusion of Norra Kärr in Sweden.

References

Silicate minerals
Sorosilicates
Titanium minerals
Barium minerals
Sodium minerals
Iron(II) minerals
Monoclinic minerals
Minerals in space group 12